Arturo Javier Ledesma Pérez (born 25 May 1988) is a Mexican professional footballer who plays as a defender for Liga de Expansión MX club Atlético Morelia.

Biography
Arturo is a young player that shows a lot of potential. At only 18 years of age, he had already debuted with Mexican giants Chivas in the Clausura 2007 tournament as well as in the CONCACAF Champions' Cup. Ledesma made his professional debut on February 17, 2007, against Atlante, a 0–3 away win for the Rebaño.

Family
Arturo's father is the former Chivas goalie Javier "Zully" Ledesma. One of his cousins is former professional baseball player, Nomar Garciaparra.

Honours
Morelia
Liga de Expansión MX: Clausura 2022

References

External links
 

Arturo Ledesma at ESPN Deportes 
eluniversal.com.mx

1988 births
Living people
Footballers from Guadalajara, Jalisco
Mexican people of Argentine descent
Sportspeople of Argentine descent
Mexico under-20 international footballers
Atlético Morelia players
C.D. Guadalajara footballers
Club Necaxa footballers
C.F. Pachuca players
Alebrijes de Oaxaca players
Correcaminos UAT footballers
Tampico Madero F.C. footballers
Liga MX players
Ascenso MX players
Association football defenders
Mexican footballers